Trewern is a village in Powys, Wales.

Trewern may also refer to:

 Trewern Hall or Trewern Farmhouse, a country house in Montgomeryshire, Wales
 Trewern House, one of the Grade II* listed buildings in Powys, Wales
 Trewern Mansion, in the village Llanddewi Velfrey, Pembrokeshire, Wales

See also
 E. P. Trewern (1895-1959), architect
 Trewen, a hamlet and a civil parish in east Cornwall, England